Nigel Adams (born 30 November 1966) is a British politician who served as Minister of State without Portfolio at the Cabinet Office from 2021 to 2022. A member of the Conservative Party, he has been Member of Parliament (MP) for Selby and Ainsty since 2010. On 9 April 2022 he announced his intention to stand down from Parliament at the next general election.

Early life
Born in Goole, and raised in Selby, he is the son of a school caretaker and school cleaner. Adams attended Camblesforth Primary School and Selby Grammar School. In 1994, with a £20 a week Enterprise Allowance Scheme Government grant, he co-founded Advanced Digital Telecom, which was sold for £3.1 million to JWE Telecom in 1999.

Political career
Adams joined the Conservative Party in 1992.

Following his successful re-election in June 2017, he was appointed Assistant Government Whip. His departmental responsibilities included Department for Environment, Food and Rural Affairs (DEFRA) and Northern Ireland Office (NIO). Following the Government reshuffle in January 2018, he was promoted to Lord Commissioner to HM Treasury in the Government Whips Office. He was appointed Parliamentary Under Secretary of State for Communities and Local Government in May 2018, continuing to act as Lord Commissioner to HM Treasury alongside his ministerial duties. 

In 2016, Adams was one of the key figures in the unsuccessful Conservative Party leadership bid by Boris Johnson. Adams appeared in the 2017 BBC docudrama Theresa vs. Boris: How May became PM.

He contested the marginal Rossendale and Darwen seat at the 2005 general election, coming second with a swing to the Conservatives of 1.9% compared to the 3.1% average they achieved nationally. Adams was then selected as the candidate for the Conservative Party in the newly created seat of Selby and Ainsty in 2006. Four years later at the 2010 general election, Adams was elected with a 23.71% majority.

Following his election to Parliament, Adams was appointed Parliamentary Private Secretary to the Leader of the House of Lords and the Chancellor of the Duchy of Lancaster, The Lord Strathclyde, and subsequently to his successor, The Lord Hill of Oareford until his resignation in August 2014. In September 2014 Adams was appointed to the Number 10 Policy Board with responsibility for economic affairs.

Adams was re-elected as Member of Parliament for Selby and Ainsty at the 2015 general election with 27,725 votes, a majority of 13,557 votes and 52.5% of the total votes cast, a swing from Labour of 1.0% compared to a negative national swing of 0.4%. He was re-elected again at the snap election on 8 June 2017 with 32,921 votes and an increased majority and vote share of 13,772 and 58.7% respectively.

In January 2016, the Labour Party unsuccessfully proposed an amendment in Parliament that would have required private landlords to make their homes "fit for human habitation". According to Parliament's register of interests, Adams was one of 72 Conservative MPs who voted against the amendment who personally derived an income from renting out property. The Conservative Government had responded to the amendment that they believed homes should be fit for human habitation but did not want to pass the new law that would explicitly require it.

Until June 2017, Adams was Chairman of the All-Party Parliamentary Biomass Group and in 2013 he wrote an article describing the benefits of biomass. He regards wind and solar generation as relatively expensive and inflexible methods of renewable energy. Whilst coal is reliable and available, it is not renewable and converts inactive carbon stored underground into carbon dioxide thus increasing  levels. Drax and Eggborough power stations are major UK electricity producers in his constituency. Both power stations are capable of burning biomass. 

In January 2015, Adams introduced the Onshore wind subsidies (abolition) bill to Parliament which passed to the next stage following a close vote.

Until June 2017, Adams was Chairman of the All Party Group for Music and in November 2015 he instigated several Parliamentary debates on the difficulties facing UK musicians accessing visas for touring the US. The group has additionally held a session on the State of Access report aimed at improving access to live music for deaf and disabled people. Adams has campaigned to change the law on Secondary Ticketing and he successfully persuaded the government to outlaw the use of bots for the purpose of purchasing event tickets for resale. He also successfully lobbied to outlaw the use of flares and fireworks at music events and festivals. He was Secretary of the All-Party Parliamentary Group on Industrial Heritage.

Adams was in favour of Brexit prior to the 2016 referendum.

In March 2017, Adams was instructed to apologise to the House of Commons after the Commons Committee on Standards ruled that he had breached the MPs' code of conduct by failing to declare his interest in a telecommunications company while taking part in parliamentary inquiries relating to the industry.

He had previous held various government ministerial posts. These have included as an Assistant Government Whip on two occasions (June 2017 to January 2018, November 2018 to April 2019), Parliamentary Under-Secretary of State for Wales and Minister for Sport, Media and Creative Industries. 

On 13 February 2020, Adams was appointed Minister of State for Asia during the first cabinet reshuffle of the second Johnson ministry.

On 16 September 2021, Adams was appointed Minister of State without Portfolio at the Cabinet Office during the cabinet reshuffle.

In April 2022, Adams announced his intention to stand down at the next general election.

On 5 September 2022, following the election of Liz Truss as Leader of the Conservative Party, Adams resigned his position as Minister of State without Portfolio.

Constituency issues

 In November 2013, Adams gained praise from the Chancellor, George Osborne, for successfully leading the campaign to restore the concessionary coal allowance to retired coal miners, who had their allowance stopped following the collapse of UK Coal.
 In December 2014, Adams and Mark Crane, leader of Selby District Council, successfully lobbied race organisers for Selby District to host a stage of the international cycle race known as the Tour de Yorkshire.
 He is Vice Chairman of the All-Party Parliamentary Beer Group, as Tadcaster in the Selby and Ainsty constituency is a brewing town with Heineken, Molson Coors and Samuel Smith's Old Brewery.
 In October 2015, The Daily Telegraph highlighted problems associated with a private company's recycled waste. The company had gone bankrupt and Adams was pictured in Great Heck where a tip with up to 10,000 tons of "stinking" and steaming household waste was said to be making people sick.

Expenses
Between 2011 and 2012, Adams claimed the Independent Parliamentary Standards Authority (IPSA) approved accommodation allowance of £26,144 against a maximum annual allowance of £27,875 based on having four children living with him in London. Critics pointed out the coalition government removed support for other families earning £60,000. Since his election in 2010, his average accommodation costs have been £21,468.36 per year against a maximum annual allowance of £27,875.00.

Donations 
In 2015, Adams voted against plain cigarette packaging in the Tobacco Products Regulation motion. He had previously accepted £1,188 in hospitality from Japan Tobacco International during the 2012 Chelsea Flower Show. He was criticised by Greenpeace for promoting biomass as an energy source after accepting more than £50,000 in political donations and hospitality from companies in the biomass sector.

Personal life
Adams is married to Claire (née Robson) who works part-time as his office manager on a salary just under £20,000. The couple have four children and live in Yorkshire.

He is a patron of the Selby Hands of Hope charity. A cricket enthusiast, he is active on the Yorkshire committee of the Lord's Taverners. While playing for the Lords and Commons Cricket team against the MCC at Lord's in 2013, he scored an unbeaten century.

Adams has served as a governor at two of his former schools, Camblesforth Primary school (2002–04) and Selby High School (2007–11).

Notes

References

External links
Nigel Adams MP official constituency website
Nigel Adams MP Conservative Party profile
Selby and Ainsty Conservatives

Nigel Adams Profile at New Statesman Your Democracy

1966 births
Living people
Conservative Party (UK) MPs for English constituencies
People educated at Selby High School
People from Selby
UK MPs 2010–2015
UK MPs 2015–2017
UK MPs 2017–2019
UK MPs 2019–present